Abbeydorney railway station served the village of Abbeydorney in County Kerry, Ireland.

The station opened on 20 December 1880. The first Station Master appointed to Abbeydorney was a Mr John Hogan, a descendant of the Galloping O'Hogans of Limerick. He is laid to rest across the fields in the Old Abbey. The first passenger train made its maiden trip on 1 November of that year. Passenger services were withdrawn on 4 February 1963, although the route through Abbeydorney continued to be used by freight trains for a while before the line to Listowel was finally closed altogether in 1977 and then to Tralee 1978. The station closed on 6 February 1978.

References

Further reading

External links
 http://homepage.tinet.ie/~abbeydorney/book/station.html

Disused railway stations in County Kerry
Railway stations opened in 1880
Railway stations closed in 1963
1880 establishments in Ireland
1978 disestablishments in Ireland
Railway stations in the Republic of Ireland opened in the 19th century